Show Dogs is a 2018 American buddy cop comedy film directed by Raja Gosnell and written by Max Botkin and Marc Hyman.  It stars Will Arnett, Ludacris, Natasha Lyonne, Jordin Sparks, Gabriel Iglesias, Shaquille O'Neal, Omar Chaparro, and Stanley Tucci. The film follows a Rottweiler police dog and his human partner who go undercover at a prestigious dog show to stop an animal smuggling activity. The film was released in the United States on May 18, 2018, to negative reviews from critics.

A week after its release, the film came under fire when several critics and parents' groups accused it of including a scene normalizing child grooming. The studio apologized and recut the film, re-releasing it on its second weekend in theaters. The film grossed $39 million against its $5.5 million budget.

Plot
A macho Rottweiler K-9 police dog named Max (Ludacris) attempts to rescue Ling-Li (Delaney Milbourn), a baby giant panda, from being sold by an animal smuggling ring but inadvertently foils an FBI sting operation involving his human partner Frank (Will Arnett), who blames Max for letting the criminals escape. The two enemies must now work together and pose as a show dog and his trainer at the Canini Invitational dog show in Las Vegas to stop the animal smuggling ring.

Cast
 Will Arnett as FBI agent Frank Nicholas, Max's human partner
 Natasha Lyonne as Mattie
 Omar Chaparro as Señor Gabriel 
 Oliver Tompsett as Chauncey
 Andy Beckwith as Berne
 Kerry Shale as Thin Man
 Bradley Gosnell as Stage Manager
 Flaminia Cinque as Spa Manager

Voices
 Ludacris as Max, a Rottweiler working as a K-9 police dog
 Jordin Sparks as Daisy, an Australian Shepherd and Max's love interest.
 RuPaul as Persephone, a Mexican Hairless Dog
 Gabriel Iglesias as Sprinkles, a Pug
 Shaquille O'Neal as Karma, a Komondor
 Stanley Tucci as Philippe, a French Papillon
 Alan Cumming as Dante, a haughty Yorkshire Terrier
 Anders Holm, Blake Anderson, and Kate Micucci as a trio of pigeons that are deputized by Max.
 Kerry Shale as Sarge, Luther, Deepak the tiger, Chicago Rottweiler, backstage dogs 
 Bradley Gosnell as Caesar's announcer, Rottweiler, male Labrador Retriever, king Poodle, agility dogs, backstage dogs
 Delaney Milbourn as Sparky, Ling Li, Mama Rottweiler, Afghan, female Labrador, cannonball Terrier, cowabunga dog, backstage dogs
 Stephen Hogan as Bullmastiff, Canini Announcer
 Andrew Ortenberg as agility dogs, backstage dogs

Production
Show Dogs began filming on November 28, 2016 at Pinewood Studio Wales in Great Britain, with additional scenes filmed on location in Las Vegas.

Release
Show Dogs was released in theaters on May 18, 2018. The film was then released on DVD and Blu-ray on August 21, 2018.

Reception

Box office
Show Dogs grossed $17.7 million in the United States and Canada, and $20.9 million in other territories, for a worldwide total of $38.8 million.

In the United States and Canada, Show Dogs was released on May 18, 2018 alongside Deadpool 2 and Book Club, and was projected to gross $7–9 million from 3,145 theaters in its opening weekend. It ended up debuting to $6 million, finishing sixth at the box office. It dropped 49% in its second weekend to $3.1 million, finishing seventh.

Critical response
The website's critical consensus reads, "Show Dogs may entertain very young viewers, but for anyone else, it threatens the cinematic equivalent of a rolled-up newspaper on the snout." On Metacritic, the film has a weighted average score of 31 out of 100, based on reviews from 14 critics, indicating "generally unfavorable reviews". Audiences polled by CinemaScore gave the film an average grade of "A−" on an A+ to F scale.

Christy Lemire of RogerEbert.com gave the film 0.5 out of four stars and said that from "the barely-there characters to the cheesy visual effects to the flat attempts at knowingly corny laughs, this reeks of the kind of material you'd have the misfortune of discovering in the bargain bin under the merciless fluorescent lights of your local soulless superstore. It is bleak indeed. Your family deserves better." 

Peter Hartlaub of the San Francisco Chronicle gave the film zero out of four stars and strongly criticized (among other things) the production, jokes, and pacing; ultimately concluding that "Show Dogs is really bad, even for a talking-dog movie" and that "we all deserve a better live-action talking-dog movie than this."

British film critic Mark Kermode also panned the film in his review and later declared it the worst film of 2018.

In contrast, Michael Rechtshaffen of The Hollywood Reporter wrote: "...thanks to some creative character casting and a self-aware script that isn't averse to poking fun at itself, Show Dogs emerges as a high-concept family comedy that manages to avoid being taken for the runt of the litter, even if it doesn't really bring anything fresh and different to the arena."

Accolades

Child grooming controversy and resulting re-cut 

The film was criticized for normalizing child grooming based on a plot point that depicts the canine main character being forced to have his genitals fondled by a dog show judge without consent. In the film, other characters "teach" him not to think about it and to go to his "happy place" when that happens. Initially, in a test screening for the film, online magazine Macaroni Kids Terina Maldonado said "With the #MeToo movement and all the talk of sexual predators in Hollywood, I couldn't help but think this message, that is blatantly in the open for adults to see, but over a child's understanding, is meant to groom children to be open to having people touch their privates, even though they don't want it." 

Spurred on by this review, other professional reviewers agreed that the child grooming implications were "disturbing and serious". Bob Hoose of Focus on the Family's entertainment guide "Plugged in" described the content in his review but did not ascribe motive, although he did not disagree with Maldonado's interpretation. Slates Ruth Graham said that the genital fondling subplot was "darker" than the light-hearted humor in the rest of the film. 

The British Board of Film Classification took a different perspective, writing in its annual report, "Before the film started its UK release, some members of the public, who had not yet seen it but who had read blog posts from the US suggesting that these scenes might reduce the resistance of children to adults touching them inappropriately, expressed concerns. However, the scene in question is light, comic and entirely non-sexual, if a little rude. Our view is that the US allegations were a misinterpretation of the scene in question."

In response to these concerns, the film's co-writer Max Botkin stated that he did not write those scenes and that the original script was "heavily rewritten by 13 other writers", going on to strongly condemn the themes in question. Additionally, the film's distributor Global Road Entertainment announced they were re-cutting the film and resubmitting it to theaters in time for its second weekend, stating the following to Deadline Hollywood:

The National Center on Sexual Exploitation, formerly Morality in Media, still objected to the edited version of the film, writing that it retains many of the controversial genital-touching scenes and thus strongly advising parents and caregivers to avoid taking children to it.

References

External links
 
 

2018 comedy films
2018 films
2010s buddy cop films
American comedy films
Films about dogs
Films about the Federal Bureau of Investigation
Film controversies
Film controversies in the United States
Animal cruelty incidents in film
Obscenity controversies in film
Open Road Films films
Films directed by Raja Gosnell
Films scored by Heitor Pereira
Self-censorship
Films set in Nevada
Films set in the Las Vegas Valley
Films with screenplays by Marc Hyman
2010s English-language films
2010s American films
Child grooming